Stewart Angus MacFarlane (born November 1953, Adelaide, South Australia), is a figurative Australian painter.  His style is a pared-down realism (with expressionistic touches) combined with a surreality of lighting and perspective. He often, though not always, places a female or male nude in a situation of erotic enigma.   He paints the Australian scene representative of Western society as a whole.

Career
When aged 16 he enrolled at the South Australian School of Art, where he was influenced by the Adelaide painters, David Dridan and David Dallwitz.  He gained a Diploma of Fine Arts (Painting) in 1974. The next year he travelled to America where he had group and solo exhibitions, as well as pursuing his other love, music. In 1977 he graduated with a Bachelor in Fine Arts (Painting) from the School of Visual Arts, New York City.
He was a studio assistant of Janet Fish. Since returning to Australia in 1983, MacFarlane has earned his living as a professional painter, exhibiting several times a year, either in Australia or internationally.

MacFarlane is also a musician. His band, "Stew Lane and The Untouchables", performed and recorded in New York City from 1979 to 1981.  The Album, Harder Than Wax was released by AZ International, France, in 1980. The band's independent release, "U.N.Rap Song" (Private Ear Records, 1980) was acknowledged by Freddy Fresh as one of the earliest rap records and one of the first examples of a group, outside the hip-hop genre, to incorporate rap into their music.

Selected exhibitions
 "The Big Picture", Wei-Ling Gallery, Kuala Lumpur, Malaysia, 2013
 "Second Sight", Australian Galleries, Sydney, Australia, 2013
 "Ordinary Beauty", Adelaide Central School of Art Gallery, August 2012
 "Mainland", Australian Galleries, Melbourne, October 2011
 "Inheritance", Wei-Ling Gallery, Kuala Lumpur, May 2011
 Michael Reid, Sydney, September 2010
 Fletcher Jones Art Prize 2010, Geelong Gallery, Geelong, July–September 2010
 The Shilo Project, University of Melbourne, November 2009 – March 2010.
 Master Landscapes of the Mornington Peninsula, Mornington Peninsula Regional Gallery, December 2009 – March 2010
 Philip Bacon Galleries, Brisbane, March 2009
 Charles Nodrum Gallery, Melbourne, November–December 2008
 Roswell Museum and Art Center, New Mexico, USA, February–March 2008
 Wei-Ling Gallery, Kuala Lumpur, Malaysia, September–October 2006
 Dridan Fine Arts, Adelaide, September 2005
 Bett Gallery, Hobart, March–April 2005
 Imaging the Apple, University of Ballarat, February 2004 – August 2005
 Galerie Carlos Hulsch Berlin, Germany, October–November 2003

Monographs
 Helmridge-Marsillian, Veronique, Stewart MacFarlane. Riddles of Life, Craftsman House, Sydney, 1996
 Jose, Nicholas & Morrell, Timothy,  "Stewart MacFarlane, Paintings", Wei-Ling Gallery, Kuala Lumpur, 2012

Books
 Aland, Jenny, Australian Artlook, Heinemann, Melbourne, 1997
 Drury, Nevill, Images 2, Contemporary Australian Painting, Craftsman House, Sydney, 1994
 Drury, Nevill, Images 3, Contemporary Australian Painting, Craftsman House, Sydney, 1998
 McCulloch, Alan, (rev. by Susan McCulloch), The Encyclopedia of Australian Art, Allen and Unwin, Sydney, 1994
 McCulloch, Alan, McCulloch, Susan, and McCulloch, Emily, The New McCulloch's Encyclopedia of Australian Art, Miegunyah Press, Melbourne, 2006
 Pickett, Charles, Cars and Culture. Our Driving Passions, HarperCollins and Powerhouse Publishing, Sydney, 1999
 Williams, Donald, and Simpson, Colin, Art Now. Contemporary Art Post-1970, McGraw-Hill, Sydney, 1994

Articles
 Adam, Rosemary, "Stewart MacFarlane: 'Roswell'", Art Monthly, September 1990
 Adam, Rosemary, "Stewart MacFarlane", Tension, March 1992
 Heathcote, Christopher, "Summer Famine", Art Monthly, March 1989
 Helmridge-Marsillian, Veronique, "Work and Sex. Three Paintings by Stewart MacFarlane", Art Monthly, July 1994
 Morrell, Timothy, "The Function", Artlines, Queensland Art Gallery Society, August–September 1997

Catalogues
 Katz, Vincent, Compulsion: Stewart MacFarlane, Brisbane City Gallery, 2001
 Leong, Roger, The Painted Self. Rick Amor, Peter Churcher, Kevin Lincoln, Stewart MacFarlane and Lewis Miller, Mornington Peninsula Regional Gallery, 2006
 MacFarlane, Stewart, Door of Memories, Roswell Museum and Art Center, New Mexico, USA, 1987
 MacFarlane, Stewart, Screenplay, Galerie Carlos Hulsch Berlin, Germany, 2000
 MacFarlane, Stewart, and Helmridge-Marsillian, Veronique, Stewart MacFarlane. Small Observations. A Survey of Small Oil Paintings 1967–2005, Carnegie Gallery, Hobart, 2006
 Rufe, Laurie, and Fleming, Stephen, Beyond a Gift of Time. Current Work by Former Fellows of the Roswell Artist-in-Residence Program, Roswell Museum and Art Center, New Mexico, USA, 2008
 Smith, Jason, So You Wanna Be a Rock 'n' Roll Star, NGV Shell Collection, 2005
 Wei-Ling, Lim, Private Life. Stewart MacFarlane, Wei-Ling Gallery, Kuala Lumpur, Malaysia, 2006

Video
 Nedelkopolous, Nicholas. Private View (2004, 49 mins, Mini Digital Video) Documentary on artist Stewart MacFarlane.

References

External links
 stewartmacfarlane.com , official site
 Australian Galleries 
 Private View by Nicholas Nedelkopoulos

Australian painters
Realist artists
Australian musicians
Living people
1953 births
Archibald Prize finalists